FC Slovkhlib Slovyansk was a Ukrainian football club from Sloviansk, Donetsk Oblast. Slovkhlib played at Khimik Stadium.

The club was founded in 1999 and participated in the regional competitions.

See also
 SC Dynamo Sloviansk
 Football Federation of Donetsk Oblast

References

External links
 Slovkhlib Sloviansk is the 2008 champion of Donetsk region. Football Federation of Ukraine. 15 November 2008

 
Football clubs in Sloviansk
Defunct football clubs in Ukraine
Association football clubs established in 1999
Association football clubs disestablished in 2012
1999 establishments in Ukraine
2012 disestablishments in Ukraine